The 2021–22 Florida Panthers season was the 29th season for the National Hockey League franchise that was established in 1993.  Head coach Joel Quenneville returned to coach his third season with the team. The Panthers began the season 3–0–0 for the second time in team history in as many years.

Quenneville resigned from his coaching duties as a result of the fallout from the 2010 Chicago Blackhawks sexual assault scandal on October 28, 2021. On October 29, assistant coach Andrew Brunette was named interim head coach. 

The franchise record season opening winning streak reached an 8–0–0 record. The streak ended after the Panthers lost to the Boston Bruins 3–2 in a shootout. The Panthers became the seventh team to begin the season at 8–0–0. The Panthers became the first team to clinch a berth in the 2022 Stanley Cup playoffs following a 5–3 win over the Buffalo Sabres on April 3, 2022. On April 21, the Panthers clinched the Atlantic Division title, and on April 28, they won the Presidents' Trophy for the first time in franchise history. 

On May 13, 2022, the Florida Panthers won their first playoff series since 1996 by defeating the Washington Capitals in six games, only to suffer an upset in the Second Round by the Tampa Bay Lightning, who swept them in four games.

Standings

Divisional standings

Conference standings

Schedule and results

Regular season

Playoffs

Player statistics

Skaters

Goaltenders

†Denotes player spent time with another team before joining the Panthers. Stats reflect time with the Panthers only.
‡Denotes player was traded mid-season. Stats reflect time with the Panthers only.Bold/italics denotes franchise record.

Transactions
The Panthers have been involved in the following transactions during the 2021–22 season.

Trades

Notes:
 Buffalo will receive a first-round pick in 2022 if the selection is outside of the top 10; otherwise Buffalo will receive a first-round pick in 2023.
 Florida will receive the later of either New York's or Winnipeg's 4th-round pick.
 Montreal will receive Florida's 1st-round pick in 2024 if Florida retains their 2022 1st-round pick.
 Philadelphia will receive Florida's 1st-round pick in 2024 if it falls outside the top 10 selections, otherwise Philadelphia will receive Florida's 1st-round pick in 2025.

Players acquired

Players lost

Signings

Draft picks

Below are the Florida Panthers' selections at the 2021 NHL Entry Draft, which were held on July 23 to 24, 2021. It was held virtually via Video conference call from the NHL Network studio in Secaucus, New Jersey.

References

Florida Panthers

Florida Panthers seasons
Presidents' Trophy seasons
Florida Panthers
Florida Panthers